Wanda is a female given name.

Wanda may also refer to:

People
 Wanda people, an ethnic group in Tanzania
For individual people named Wanda, see Wanda

Geography
 Wanda, Illinois, United States
 Wanda, Minnesota, United States
 Wanda, Missouri, United States
 Wanda, West Virginia, United States
 Wanda Township, Adams County, Nebraska, United States
 Wanda Beach, Sydney, New South Wales, Australia
 Wanda, Burkina Faso
 Wanda, Argentina
 Wanda Mountains (完达山), in Mainland China
 Wanda River (萬大溪), in Taiwan
 Wanda (crater), a crater in the Akna Montes on Venus

Entertainment
 Wanda (magazine), a weekly literature magazine in Warsaw
 Wanda (band), an Austrian indie pop band.
 Wanda (film), a 1970 American film
 A Fish Called Wanda, a 1988 British film
 Wanda, the fifth of Antonín Dvořák's 11 operas, based on a Polish legend
 Wanda, the title character of an 1883 novel by Ouida
 "Handa Wanda", song by The Wild Magnolias (1970)
 "Kinda Fonda Wanda" a song by Neil Young on his album Everybody's Rockin'

Others
 1057 Wanda, an asteroid
 Wanda Group (万达集团 / 大连万达), a Chinese conglomerate
Wanda Media, a film company
 Dalian Wanda F.C. (大连万达足球俱乐部), former name of Dalian Shide F.C., a football club in Dalian, Liaoning, China
 Wanda Metropolitano, stadium of Atlético Madrid sponsored by Wanda Group
 Wanda Films, a Spanish film distributing company
 Wanda Beach Murders, two unsolved Australian murders in 1965
 For tropical cyclones named Wanda, see List of storms named Wanda
 For Wanda the first ever captive orca, see List of captive orcas

See also